Lynx Casino is a 1992 gambling simulator for the Atari Lynx developed by Brian A. Rice Inc. It includes blackjack, craps, roulette, slot machines, and video poker.

Gameplay

Development and release

Reception 

The four reviewers of Electronic Gaming Monthly regarded Lynx Casino as one of the best gambling simulators available, citing the large selection of games, the easy-to-read display despite the small screen size, and the clever Easter eggs planted throughout the game. They gave it a 7 out of 10. Robert A. Jung at IGN gave the game 7 out of 10 in a 1999 retrospective review.

References

External links 
 Lynx Casino at AtariAge
 Lynx Casino at GameFAQs
 Lynx Casino at MobyGames

1992 video games
Atari Lynx games
Atari Lynx-only games
Casino video games
Video games developed in the United States